The Dourdou de Camarès (literally Dourdou of Camarès) is an  long river in the Tarn, Hérault and Aveyron departments in southern France. It flows generally northwest.

Its main tributary is the Sorgues.

Departments and communes along its course
The following list is ordered from source to mouth : 
 Tarn: Murat-sur-Vèbre
 Hérault: Castanet-le-Haut
 Aveyron: Arnac-sur-Dourdou, Brusque, Fayet, Sylvanès, Camarès, Montlaur, Vabres-l'Abbaye, Saint-Affrique, Calmels-et-le-Viala, Saint-Izaire, Broquiès

References

Rivers of France
Rivers of Occitania (administrative region)
Rivers of Tarn (department)
Rivers of Hérault
Rivers of Aveyron
Occitanie region articles needing translation from French Wikipedia